The Pre-Libertadores tournament was an annual bi-national football competition held from 1998 to 2002, contested by teams from Venezuela and Mexico, that defined two teams qualified for the following year's Copa Libertadores (except for the first edition, which was played in the same year as the respective Copa Libertadores).

The tournament was an initiative of Mexican promoters, close to the Mexican Football Federation and the Televisa company, who sought to get Mexican teams into CONMEBOL's top club competition.

History
In 1997, Grupo Pegaso (founded by Alejandro Burillo Azcárraga), through promoter Eduardo Aguirre, began talks with the Venezuelan league clubs and the Venezuelan Football Federation (FVF) to purchase the slots that corresponded to Venezuelan teams in the Copa Libertadores (2 direct slots at that time). Negotiations lasted until December of that year when the parties reached an agreement in a meeting held in Asunción, Paraguay; the two Venezuelan slots in the Libertadores Cup would be disputed in a preliminary tournament by two Venezuelan and two Mexican teams, in exchange, the Mexican side was to make a payment of US$200,000 to each Venezuelan team participating and US$80,000 to the FVF. The agreement had CONMEBOL's approval, however, CONCACAF's permission was still needed to allow the Mexican teams to participate.

In early January 1998, Rafael Esquivel, president of the FVF at the time, and his treasurer Emiliano Rodríguez travel to Mexico to finalize the details of the tournament and then to the United States to meet with CONCACAF authorities. Finally, CONCACAF authorized the participation of the Mexican teams and 3 February is announced as the start date of the tournament.

Results
During its six editions, the tournament has always been won by a Mexican team and only twice has a Venezuelan team qualified for the Copa Libertadores.

References